Vincent is a male given name derived from the Roman name Vincentius, which is derived from the Latin word  (to conquer).

People with the given name

Artists 
Vincent Apap (1909–2003), Maltese sculptor
Vincent van Gogh (1853–1890), Dutch Post-Impressionist painter
Vincent Munier (born 1976), French wildlife photographer

Saints 
Vincent of Saragossa (died 304), deacon and martyr, patron saint of Lisbon and Valencia
Vincent, Orontius, and Victor (died 305), martyrs who evangelized in the Pyrenees
Vincent of Digne (died 379), French bishop of Digne
Vincent of Lérins (died 445), Church father, Gallic author of early Christian writings
Vincent Madelgarius (died 677), Benedictine monk who established two monasteries in France
Vincent Ferrer (1350–1419), Valencian Dominican missionary and logician
Vincent de Paul (1581–1660), Catholic priest who served the poor
Vicente Liem de la Paz (Vincent Liem the Nguyen, 1732–1773), Vincent Duong, Vincent Tuong, and Vincent Yen Do of the Vietnamese Martyrs
Vincent Pallotti (1795–1850), Italian ecclesiastic

Politicians and government officials 
Vincent Auriol (1884–1966), French politician who served as President of France from 1947 to 1954
Vincent Bru (born 1955), French politician
Sir John Vincent "Vince" Cable (born 1943), British politician
Vincent Candelora, American businessman, lawyer, and politician
Vince Catania (born 1977), Australian politician
Vincent Stuart de Silva Wikramanayake (1876–1953), Sri Lankan Sinhala lawyer and politician
Vincent B. Dixie (born 1973), American businessman and politician
Vincent Fang (entrepreneur) (born 1943), politician in Hong Kong
Vince Martin (1920–2001), Australian politician
Vincent Massey (1887–1967), Canadian lawyer, diplomat and 18th Governor General of Canada
Vincent Orange (born 1957), American politician and attorney
Vincent Perera (1918–1993), Sri Lankan Sinhala politician, Mayor of Colombo from 1965-1966
Vincent Pierre (born 1964), American politician
Vincent Rolland (born 1970), French politician
Vincent Seitlinger (born 1987), French politician

In sports

American football
Vince Biegel (born 1993), American football player
Vinnie Clark (born 1979), American former National Football League player
Vince Courville (born 1959), American former National Football League player
Vince Dooley (1932–2022), American former football coach
Vincent Edward "Bo" Jackson (born November 30, 1962) American former National Football League player and former Major League Baseball player.
Vince Lombardi (1913–1970), American National Football League player, coach and executive
Vince Promuto (1938–2021), American National Football League player
Vincent Taylor (American football) (born 1994), American football player
Vinny Testaverde (born 1963), American former National Football League quarterback
Vince Warren (born 1963), American former National Football League player
Vince Wilfork (born 1981), American former National Football League player

Association football
Vincent Aboubakar (born 1992), Cameroonian professional footballer
Vincent Candela, French football player
Vincent Enyeama (born 1982), Nigerian former footballer
Vincent Kompany (born 1986), Belgian former footballer
Vincent Lamy (born 1999), Canadian soccer player
Vincent Nogueira (born 1988), French former professional footballer
Vincent Rabiega (born 1995), professional footballer
Vincent Rüfli (born 1988), Swiss professional footballer
Vincent Sierro (born 1995), Swiss professional footballer

Baseball
Vince Coleman (born 1961), American former Major League Baseball player
Vince DiMaggio (1912–1986), American Major League Baseball player, older brother of Joe and Dom DiMaggio
Vin Scully (1927–2022), American sportscaster, called Brooklyn/Los Angeles Dodgers games from 1950 to 2016

Basketball
Vincent Askew (born 1966), American former professional basketball player
Vince Carter (born 1977), National Basketball Association player
Vincent Collet (born 1963), French basketball coach
Vincent Kesteloot (born 1995), Belgian professional basketball player
Vincent Masingue (born 1976), French former professional basketball player
Vincent Mendy (basketball) (born 1983), French professional basketball player
Vincent Nguyen (basketball) (born 1995), Vietnamese-Dutch professional basketball player
Vincent Poirier (born 1993), French professional basketball player
Vincent Rivaldi Kosasih (born 1996), Indonesian basketball player
Vincent Sanford (born 1990), American basketball player
Vincent Yarbrough (born 1981), American former professional basketball player

Wrestling
Vince McMahon (born 1945), American professional wrestling promoter and owner, chairman and CEO of World Wrestling Entertainment
Vince McMahon Sr. (1914–1984), American professional wrestling promoter, father of the above
 Vinny Marseglia (born 1986), known as Vincent in ROH
 Virgil (wrestler) (born 1962), known as Vincent in WCW

Other sports
Vinnie Anderson (born 1979), New Zealand rugby league footballer
Vincent Bachet (born 1978), professional French ice hockey defenceman
Vincent Barnes (born 1960), South African first-class cricketer
Vincent Barteau (born 1962), former French road racing cyclist
Vincent Boury (born 1969), French table tennis player
Vincent Brewster (born 1940), Barbadian cricketer
Vincent Carrara (born 1905, date of death unknown), French racing cyclist
Vince Clarke (cricketer) (born 1971), English former cricketer
Vincent Clerc (born 1981), former French rugby union player
Vincent Confait (born 1959), Seychellois sprinter
Vincent Dargein (1863–1917), French fencer
Vincent Defrasne (born 1977), former French biathlete
Vincent De Haître (born 1994), Canadian dual-sport athlete competing as both a speed skater and track cyclist
Vincent Dias Dos Santos (born 1990), Luxembourgish cyclo-cross cyclist
Vincent Favretto (born 1984), French pole vaulter
Vincent Hermance (born 1984), French mountain bike trials cyclist
Vincent Gagnon (born 1981), Canadian retired racquetball player
Vincent Garos (born 1982), retired French sailor
Vincent Gauthier-Manuel (born 1986), French alpine skier and Paralympic athlete
Vincent Hancock (born 1989), American Olympic shooter
Vinnie Hinostroza (born 1994), American hockey player
Vincent Hoppezak (born 1999), Dutch road and track cyclist
Vincent Mumo Kiilu (born 1982), Kenyan sprint runner and hurdler
Vincent Laigle (born 1973), French badminton player
Vincent Lange (born 1974), German volleyball player
Vincent Lavenu (born 1956), French former professional road bicycle racer
Vincent Lecavalier (born 1980), Canadian former National Hockey League player
Vincent Le Dauphin (born 1976), retired French athlete who specialised in the 3000 metres steeplechase
Vincent Le Quellec (born 1975), French former track cyclist
Vincent Luis (born 1989), French professional triathlete
Vincent Lynch (cyclist) (born 1968), Barbadian former cyclist
Vincent Matthews (athlete) (born 1947), American former sprinter
Vincent Millot (born 1986), French tennis player
Vincent Pelluard (born 1990), French-Colombian cyclist
Vincent Pelo (born 1988), French rugby union player
Vince Phillips (born 1963), American boxer and former IBF champion
Vincent Morris Scheer (1904–1986), light welterweight champion boxer under the ring name Mushy Callahan
Vince O'Sullivan (born 1957), American racewalker
Vincent Reed (born 1940), English cricketer
Vincent Reffet (1984–2020), French BASE jumper, skydiver, wingsuit flyer, and jetman
Vincent Ricard (born 1985), French bobsledder
Vincent Richards (1903 – 1959), American tennis player
Vincent Rousseau (born 1962), former long-distance runner from Belgium
Vincent Salazard (1909–1993), French racing cyclist
Vincent Soler (1928–2012), Algerian racing cyclist
Vincent ter Schure (born 1979), Dutch Paralympic cyclist
Vincent Vitetta (1925–2021), French cyclist
Vincent Vittoz (born 1975), French former cross-country skier, non-commissioned officer and coach
Vincent Winn (born 1966), former English cricketer
Vincent Zhou (born 2000), American figure skater
Vincent Zouaoui-Dandrieux (born 1980), French long-distance runner who specialises in the steeplechase

Actors and directors 
Vincent Cassel (born 1966), French actor
Vincent Corazza, Canadian voice actor
Vincent D'Onofrio (born 1959), American actor, director, producer, writer, and singer
Vincent Gallo (born 1961), American actor, director and musician
George Vincent "Vince" Gilligan, (born 1967), American writer, director, and producer
Vincent Guastaferro (born 1950), American film, stage and television actor
Vince Howard (1929–2002), American film and television actor
Vinnie Jones (born 1965), British actor and former footballer
Vincent Kartheiser (born 1979), American actor
Vincent Martella (born 1992), American actor, singer, and musician
Vincente Minnelli (1903–1986), American director, best known for directing classic movie musicals
Vincent Pastore (born 1946), American actor
Vincent Piazza (born 1976), American actor, singer, and producer
Vincent Price (1911–1993), American actor best known for his performances in horror films
Vincent Regan (born 1966), British actor
Vincent Schiavelli (1948-2005), American actor his tall stature
Vincent Sherman (1906–2006), American director and actor
Vincent Tong (voice actor) (born 1980), Canadian actor
Vincent Vaas (1922–2004), Sri Lankan Sinhala actor
Vince Vaughn (born 1970), American actor
 Vincent Wong (born 1983), Hong Kong actor and singer
Vincent Zhao (born 1972), Chinese actor and martial artist

In music

Songs 
"Vincent" (Don McLean song), 1972 folk rock song with the opening line "Starry Starry Night"
"Vincent" (Sarah Connor song), 2019 pop song
"Vincent", a song by Car Seat Headrest from their 2016 album Teens of Denial

Music artists 
as Vincent
Vincent (music producer) (born 1995), Canadian electronic music producer and pianist (born Robert Hughes)
Vincent Lübeck (1654–1740), German Baroque-era composer of organ music
Vincent Persichetti (1915–1987), American composer, teacher and pianist
Vincent Pontare (born 1980), Swedish singer and songwriter, known also by the mononym Vincent
Vincent Jamal Staples (Born 1993), American rapper
St. Vincent (musician), stage name of American indie rock singer-songwriter and guitarist Annie Clark (born 1982)
Vinnie Amico (born 1969), American multi-genre drummer, long-standing member of jam band moe.
Vinnie Bell (1932–2019), American session guitarist
Vinnie Colaiuta (born 1956), an American session drummer
Vinnie Moore (born 1964), American guitarist and member of the English hard rock band UFO
Vinnie Paul (1964–2018), American rock/metal drummer, founding member of the band Pantera
Vinnie Vincent (born 1952), American rock/metal guitarist, formerly with Kiss

As Vince
Vince Clarke (born 1960), English musician, part of Depeche Mode, Yazoo, The Assembly, Erasure, VCMG
Vince Gill (born 1957), American country music singer, songwriter and musician
Vince Guaraldi (1928–1976), American jazz musician and pianist
Vince Hill (born 1937), English singer
Vince Martin (singer) (1937–2018), American folk singer and songwriter
Vince Neil (born 1961), American lead singer of rock band Mötley Crüe

Writers 
Vincent Harding (July 25, 1931 – May 19, 2014), American historian and civil rights activist
Vincent O'Sullivan (American writer) (1868–1940), American short story writer, poet and critic 
Vincent O'Sullivan (New Zealand poet) (born 1937), New Zealand poet, short story writer, novelist, playwright, critic and editor
Vincent Cronin (1924–2011), British biographer
Vince Powell (1928–2009), British sitcom writer
 Vincent Waller, American writer and storyboard artist who worked on SpongeBob SquarePants

Other 
George Vincent Orange (1935–2012), New Zealand historian best known for his military biographies
Phil Vincent (1908–1979), founder of UK motorcycle company Vincent Motorcycles
Frank Vincent (1937–2017), American actor
Vincent, Prince of Denmark (born 2011)
Vincent Henry Ludovici Anthonisz, Sri Lankan Burgher physician and military officer
Vincent Astor (1891–1959), American businessman and philanthropist
Vincent Bolloré (born 1952), French billionaire businessman
Vincent Cobée (born 1968/1969), French businessman, CEO of Citroën
Vincent DeDomenico (1915–2007), American entrepreneur
Bernard Vincent Finnigan, Australian politician
Vincent F. Hendricks (born 1970), Danish philosopher and logician
Vincent Lo (born 1948), chairman of Hong Kong-based building-materials and construction firm
Vincent DePaul Lynch (1927-1984), pharmacology and toxicology professor
Vincent Mai, American businessman and philanthropist
Vincent Marotta (1924–2015), American businessman, investor and philanthropist
Vincent Sardi Jr. (1915–2007), American restaurateur
Vincent Sardi Sr. (1885–1969), American restaurateur
Vincent Tan (born 1952), Malaysian Chinese businessman and investor
Vincent Tchenguiz (born 1956), Iranian-British entrepreneur
Vincent Viola (born 1956), American billionaire businessman and U.S. Army veteran
Vincent Wardell (1903–1990), Australian businessman, manufacturer and company director
Vincent Zarrilli, businessman

Fictional characters
Vincent Chase (born 1976), fictional American actor and director from the HBO series, Entourage.
 Vincent Corleone, in The Godfather Part III
 Vincent Vega, a main character in the film Pulp Fiction
 Vincent, a contract killer in the 2004 film Collateral, played by Tom Cruise
 Lt. Vincent Hanna, a Robert Homicide Detective killer in the 1995 film Heat, played by Al Pacino
 Vincent MacKenna, in St. Vincent, played by Bill Murray
 V.I.N.CENT (Vital Information Necessary CENTralized), a robot in the 1979 Disney film The Black Hole
 Vincent Law, a main character in the series Ergo Proxy.
 Vincent, "The Beast" from Beauty and the Beast (1987 TV series), played by Ron Perlman
 Vincent Freeman, the protagonist of the 1997 film Gattaca
 Vincent Keller, "The Beast" from Beauty and the Beast (2012 TV series), played by Jay Ryan
 Vincent Benedict, in the 1988 film Twins, played by Danny DeVito
 Vinnie Patterson, from the Australian soap opera Home and Away, played by Ryan Kwanten
 Vincent Valentine, from Final Fantasy VII
 Vincent Crabbe, in the Harry Potter series
 Vincent Phantomhive, in the anime Black Butler
 Vincent Nightray, from the anime/manga Pandora Hearts
 Vinz Clortho, Keymaster of Gozer, in the film Ghostbusters
 Vincent Brooks, the main character of the 2011 Atlus video game Catherine
 Vincent, a main character in the 2015 film Disorder, played by Matthias Schoenaerts
 Father Vincent, in Silent Hill 3
 Vincent, Walt's dog in Lost
 Vincent Dorin, a character from Castlevania: Portrait of Ruin
 Vincent Sinclair, a character from House of Wax
 Vincent Nigel-Murray, one of Dr. Brennan’s "squinterns" from Bones
 Vincent Malloy, central character of the 1982 short stop-motion movie Vincent by Tim Burton
 Vincent, the main villain of Over the Hedge
 Vincent Gallagher, a private investigator in the TV series Vincent
 Vince Noir, one of the main characters of the British comedy show The Mighty Boosh

See also
Vincint (born 1991), American musician
 Veni, vidi, vici (literally "I came; I saw; I conquered")
 Victor (name) (literally "winner" or "conqueror")
 Nike (mythology)/Victoria (mythology)

References 

Masculine given names
English masculine given names
French masculine given names
Dutch masculine given names
Danish masculine given names
Swedish masculine given names
Swiss masculine given names
Surnames from given names
sk:Vincent
tr:Vincent#Kişiler